William Nicholas Leonard (January 12, 1916 – August 21, 2005) was an American aviator, a flying ace of World War II, and a rear admiral in the United States Navy.

Leonard was born in Douglas, Arizona, the son of United States Army Colonel Charles F. Leonard and his wife Hannah M. Leonard.

Leonard graduated from the United States Naval Academy in 1938 and was designated Naval Aviator #6953 in 1940. He fought in the Pacific battles of the Coral Sea, Midway and the Solomons. He won the Navy Cross at both Midway and the  Coral Sea. He was also awarded the Legion of Merit (four times), the Distinguished Flying Cross, the Air Medal (eight times) and a Bronze Star.

"In the words of Barrett Tillman, World War II aviation historian, [Leonard] is a 'national treasure' because he is so generous with his time and knowledge, records, and photos."

After the war, he became a test pilot and commander, including of carrier groups. He retired in 1971 as a rear admiral.

Two of his brothers also became high-ranking officers: Army Major General Charles F. Leonard, Jr. and Army Air Forces Lieutenant Colonel John Wallis Leonard, who was killed in action in World War II. William Leonard, his father and two brothers are all interred in Arlington National Cemetery.

References

External links

  

American test pilots
American World War II flying aces
Aviators from Arizona
Burials at Arlington National Cemetery
Recipients of the Air Medal
Recipients of the Distinguished Flying Cross (United States)
Recipients of the Legion of Merit
Recipients of the Navy Cross (United States)
United States Navy rear admirals (lower half)
United States Navy officers
United States Navy pilots of World War II
1916 births
2005 deaths